Pohranice is a village and municipality in the Nitra District in western central Slovakia, in the Nitra Region.

History
In historical records the village was first mentioned in 1075.

Geography
The village lies at an altitude of 197 metres and covers an area of 12.089 km2. It has a population 1074 people (cenzus 2011).

Ethnicity
The population is 514 (48%) Slovak, 511 (48%) Magyar, and 38 (4%) others.

References

External links
http://www.statistics.sk/mosmis/eng/run.html

Villages and municipalities in Nitra District